The Judge Advocate of the Fleet was an appointed civilian judge who was responsible for the supervision and superintendence of the court martial system in the Royal Navy from 1663 to 2008.

History
The position dates to the sixteenth century but was filled on an occasional basis until 1663 when it became a permanent role. Appointments were by Admiralty Order and included an annual stipend worth £146 between 1663 and 1666, and £182 thereafter. From 1824 the Judge Advocate jointly held the office of Counsel to the Admiralty. later styled as Counsel to the Navy Department, Ministry of Defence. A remunerated position of Deputy Judge Advocate existed from 1668 to 1679, and again from 1684 to 1831.

Until 2004 the Judge Advocate shared responsibility for the naval court martial system with the Chief Naval Judge Advocate previously known as the Deputy Judge Advocate of the Fleet, a legally trained serving naval officer who was responsible for the appointment of judge advocates. However the Chief Naval Judge Advocate's post was abolished in 2004 following a ruling by the European Court of Human Rights that held that, as a serving naval officer, his position was insufficiently independent.

The role of Judge Advocate of the Fleet was taken over by the Judge Advocate General from 2004 onwards. It was formally abolished on 31 December 2008 under the Armed Forces Act 2006.

Judge Advocates of the Fleet
1663 J. Fowler
1672 J. Brisbane
1680 H. Croone
1689 P. Foster
1689 F. Bacher
1690 Villiers Bathurst
1711 W. Strahan
1714 E. Honywood
1724 J. Copeland
1729 T. Hawes
1743 T. Kempe
1744 Charles Fearne
1768 Sir George Jackson, Bt., MP (Sir George Duckett, Bt. from 1797)
1824 Horace Twiss, KC, MP
1828 Henry John Shepherd, QC
1845 Richard Godson, QC, MP
1849 Richard Budden Crowder, QC, MP
1854 Thomas Phinn
1855 William Atherton, QC, MP
1859 Robert Porrett Collier, QC
1863 Thomas Phinn, QC
1866 John Walter Huddleston, KC
1875–1904 Alexander Staveley Hill, KC
1904–1924 Sir Reginald Brodie Dyke Acland, KC 
1924-1933 Charles Murray Pitman, KC
1933 John Graham Trapnell, KC
1943 John Lhind Pratt
1945 Hon. Ewen Edward Samuel Montagu, CBE, QC
1973 William McLaren Howard, QC
1986 HHJ Andrew Felix Waley, VRD, QC
1995 HHJ John Lionel Sessions
2004 Moribund
2008 Abolished

Deputy Judge Advocates of the Fleet
1668 J. Smith
1675 J. Southerne
1677 W. Hewer
1684 J. Walbanke
1687 S. Atkins
1689 M. Tindall
1692 S. Pett
1693 J. Burchett
1694 G. Larkin
1697 J. Fawler
1703 W. Rock
1707 M. Ferrabosco
1707 E. Honywood
1714 J. Copeland
1724 W. Bell
1740 T. Kempe
1743 Charles Fearne
1744 E. Mason
1745 G. Atkins
1754 J. Clevland
1762 R. Higgens
1780 T. Binsteed
1804 M. Greetham
1843 G. L. Greetham
1856 W. J. Hellyer
1861 W. Eastlake

References

Royal Navy
Royal Navy appointments
Legal history of England
Judiciary of England and Wales
Judiciary of Scotland
1661 establishments in England
2008 disestablishments in the United Kingdom
Legal occupations in the military
Law Officers of the Royal Navy
United Kingdom military law
Courts-martial in the United Kingdom
United Kingdom